The Combined Community Codec Pack, more commonly referred to by its acronym CCCP, was a collection of codecs (video compression filters) packed for Microsoft Windows, designed originally for the playback of anime fansubs. The CCCP was developed and maintained by members of various fansubbing groups.

The name is a pun on the name of the Soviet Union; namely, the Cyrillic alphabet version of the abbreviation of its full name (Сою́з Сове́тских Социaлисти́ческих Респу́блик). As part of the joke, the project's logo features the hammer and sickle and star from the Flag of the Soviet Union.

The CCCP was last updated on 2015-10-18. Standalone MPC-HC and mpv are more up to date alternatives.

Purpose
CCCP was created to fulfill the following:
 Alleviate the major problems caused by conflicting codec packs
 Provide a video media playback standard for the anime community
 Be capable of playing back most common video media files and formats
 Be easy to install and uninstall — even for users with no technical knowledge

The pack is small and compact, containing only what is needed for most videos; it intentionally disables support for many codecs it considers unnecessary. It thus can potentially avoid problems caused by inappropriate combinations of filters by providing an all-inclusive playback solution. To view a CCCP-approved video, one must simply theoretically uninstall all other codec packs and install the CCCP. This philosophy leads to some disadvantages; since many formats are not enabled by default, they have to be manually toggled by the user if needed. Additionally, unlike many competing packs, CCCP is designed around decoding rather than encoding, and as such doesn't include many video encoders that other packs do.

The CCCP is made only for the Microsoft Windows operating system and works with Windows XP/Vista/7/8/10. The last release to support Windows 2000 is 2010-10-10; the last release to support Windows 98/Me is 2007-02-22.

Reception
In 2006, On2 began recommending the CCCP as a simple decoding solution to feed video and audio to their Flix encoding application. The CCCP staff recommends to not use On2's included registry patch, but rather turn on or off any necessary codecs within the CCCP settings menu. In 2009, the German C't magazine recommended CCCP as the only trustworthy Codec pack available today.

Technical details

Contents
Note: Installing all of these separately will not have the same effect as installing the CCCP because the Media Player Classic Home Cinema is customized and so are all of the components' settings.
 Gabest's FLV Splitter
 Haali Media Splitter
 LAV filters
 Media Player Classic Home Cinema lite (custom build)
 xy-VSFilter

CCCP adds Video for Windows (VFW) codecs and DirectShow filters to the system, so that DirectShow/VFW based players like MPC, Winamp, and Windows Media Player will use them automatically.

Supported formats
 Container formats: AVI, OGM, MKV, MP4, FLV, 3GP and TS
 Video codecs: H.262/MPEG-2 Part 2, Generic MPEG-4 ASP (3ivx, lavc, etc.), DivX, XviD, H.264/MPEG-4 AVC, WMV9, FLV1, and Theora
 Audio codecs: MP1, MP2, MP3, AC3, DTS, AAC, Vorbis, LPCM, FLAC, TTA and WavPack

Notable formats not natively supported
 Nullsoft Streaming Video .nsv
 QuickTime .qt .mov (Can be played back with CCCP's MPC by installing the official QuickTime software or QuickTime Alternative)
 RealMedia .rm .rmvb (Can be played back with CCCP's MPC by installing the official RealPlayer software or Real Alternative)

See also
 Comparison of video codecs
 ffdshow
 GSpot and the "CCCP Insurgent" are remotely related
 QuickTime Alternative
 Real Alternative
 Media Player Classic
 K-Lite Codec Pack
 Perian (A similar bundle for Mac OS X)

References

External links
 

Codecs
Windows-only freeware